is a Japanese politician of the Liberal Democratic Party, a member of the House of Councillors in the Diet (national legislature).

Career 
A native of Hyōgo Prefecture and graduate of Waseda University, he joined the Ministry of Justice in 1970, passing the bar exam in the same year. In 1975, he entered a law school at University of Washington and after graduation worked at a law firm in Los Angeles for three years. Returning to Japan in 1980, he was elected to the House of Councillors for the first time in 2007.

References

External links 
 Official website in Japanese.

Members of the House of Councillors (Japan)
20th-century Japanese lawyers
1946 births
Living people
Liberal Democratic Party (Japan) politicians
Waseda University alumni
University of Washington School of Law alumni